Clarendon is a city in Donley County, Texas, United States. Its population was 2,026 at the 2010 census.

History
Clarendon, established in 1878, was one of the three original Panhandle settlements, the other two being Mobeetie and Tascosa. Clarendon was relocated after its original location was bypassed by the Fort Worth and Denver Railway.

The town founder was a Methodist clergyman, L.H. Carhart, who envisioned a "sobriety settlement" in contrast to typical boomtowns of that era. Clarendon acquired the sobriquet "Saints Roost" from local cowboys, hence the unusual name of the Clarendon museum, the Saints' Roost Museum.

The town was hit by two tornadoes simultaneously on March 13, 2021. The first tornado caused minor damage west of town before strengthening and causing EF2 damage on the north side of town. The other tornado damaged several homes and sheds in the town at EF0 strength.

Geography
Clarendon is located southwest of the center of Donley County at  (34.936415, −100.891182). U.S. Highway 287 passes through the city, leading west  to Amarillo and southeast  to Childress. Texas State Highway 70 leads north  to Interstate 40 and south  to Turkey.

Demographics

2020 census

As of the 2020 United States census, there were 1,877 people, 705 households, and 404 families residing in the city.

2000 census
As of the census of 2000,  1,974 people, 768 households, and 489 families resided in the city. The population density was 679 people per sq mi (262/km). The 929 housing units averaged of 320 per sq mi (123/km). The racial makeup of the city was 87.49% White, 7.19% African American, 0.76% Native American, 0.15% Asian, 2.99% from other races, and 1.42% from two or more races. Hispanics or Latinos of any race were 6.23% of the population.

Of the 768 households, 28.1% had children under the age of 18 living with them, 50.4% were married couples living together, 10.3% had a female householder with no husband present, and 36.3% were not families. About 34.9% of all households were made up of individuals, and 20.2% had someone living alone who was 65 years of age or older. The average household size was 2.31 and the average family size was 2.97.

In the city, the age distribution was 23.5% under 18, 13.9% from 18 to 24, 21.7% from 25 to 44, 21.0% from 45 to 64, and 19.9% who were 65 or older. The median age was 38 years. For every 100 females, there were 89.4 males. For every 100 females age 18 and over, there were 87.3 males.

The median income for a household in the city was $27,824, and for a family was $37,083. Males had a median income of $25,486 versus $18,882 for females. The per capita income for the city was $15,436. About 11.2% of families and 15.4% of the population were below the poverty line, including 19.0% of those under age 18 and 19.9% of those age 65 or over.

Education
Clarendon is served by the Clarendon Consolidated Independent School District. The school colors are maroon, white, and black. The school mascot is the Bronco.

Clarendon is home to Clarendon College (established 1898), the oldest center of higher education in the Texas Panhandle. It was originally affiliated with the Methodist Church. The college is located off Highway 287 in north Clarendon. The mascot is the bulldog. The colors are green and white.

References

External links

 Clarendon Economic Development 
 Clarendon Junior College

Cities in Texas
Cities in Donley County, Texas
County seats in Texas
Populated places established in 1878
1878 establishments in Texas